This is a list of uezds of the Russian Empire and its immediate successor states.

A

B

C

D

E

F

G

H

I

K

L

M

N

P

R

S

T

U

V

W

Y

Z

Б

Notes 

 
Subdivisions of the Russian Empire